Living Tomorrow Today: A Benefit for Ty Cambra is a benefit compilation put together by Julie Wager for Asian Man Records to raise money for the family of a then eleven-year-old boy suffering from Adrenoleukodystrophy (Lorenzo's Oil Disease).  It features twenty-one tracks, thirteen of which were unreleased by their respective artists. Cambra died August 23, 2014 at the age of 25.

Track listing
(Unreleased tracks are marked with an asterisk)

References

External links
Living Tomorrow Today: A Benefit for Ty Cambra website
Asian Man Records official site

Charity albums
2001 compilation albums
Pop punk compilation albums
Rock compilation albums
Asian Man Records compilation albums